The November 2008 San Francisco general elections were held on November 4, 2008 in San Francisco, California. The elections included seven seats to the San Francisco Board of Supervisors, one seat to the San Francisco County Superior Court, and twenty-two San Francisco ballot measures.

Board of Supervisors

Superior Court

Propositions 

Note: "City" refers to the San Francisco municipal government.

Proposition A 

Proposition A would authorize the City to issue $887.4 million in bonds to rebuild and improve San Francisco General Hospital. This proposition required a two-thirds majority to pass.

Proposition B 

Proposition B would establish an Affordable Housing Fund to acquire new affordable housing, funded by setting aside a portion of property taxes.

Proposition C 

Proposition C would prohibit City employees from serving on most Charter-created boards and commissions.

Proposition D 

Proposition D would allocate funds from new hotel and payroll expense tax revenues toward developing Pier 70, on the Central Waterfront, if a financial and land use plan is approved by the San Francisco Board of Supervisors.

Proposition E 

Proposition E would change the number of signatures needed to recall city officials from a fixed 10% of registered voters to a scale of from 10% to 15% based on population.

Proposition F 

Proposition F would shift City elections of some citywide offices from odd-numbered years to even-numbered years after November 2011.

Proposition G 

Proposition G would "allow City employees to purchase retirement system credit for unpaid parental leave taken before July 1, 2003, as long as the purchase price covers all city costs."

Proposition H 

Proposition H would establish public power in San Francisco, allowing the City to purchase public utilities, establishing deadlines on alternative energy use, allowing the City Public Utilities Commission to set rates, and allowing the Board of Supervisors to issue public utility bonds without voter approval.

Proposition I 

Proposition I would create the Office of Independent Ratepayer Advocate to recommend public utility rates to the City Public Utilities Commission.

Proposition J 

Proposition J would create a Historic Preservation Commission and allow it to make decisions regarding historic preservation in the City.

Proposition K 

Proposition K would decriminalize prostitution, enforce laws against crimes on sex workers, and disclose all investigations and prosecutions of violent crimes against sex workers.

Proposition L 

Proposition L would ensure first-year funding, furnish leased space, and define the scope and operations of the Community Justice Center.

Proposition M 

Proposition M would prohibit landlords from engaging in specific acts of tenant harassment and allow such enforcement by court orders, rent reduction, monetary awards, and criminal penalties.

Proposition N 

Proposition N would increase the transfer tax on properties worth $5 million or up to 1.5% and reduce the tax on residences that install solar energy systems or make seismic upgrades.

Proposition O 

Proposition O would replace the Emergency Response Fee with a functionally equivalent Access Line Tax and revise the Telephone Users Tax.

Proposition P 

Proposition P would change the size and composition of the San Francisco Transportation Authority Board from the entire Board of Supervisors to one consisting of the Mayor, the President of the Board of Supervisors, an elected City official selected by the Mayor, an elected City official selected by the President of the Board of Supervisors, and the Treasurer, and encourage the Authority to obtain expert financial review of its budgets and adopt City ethics and public records laws.

Proposition Q 

Proposition Q would include more partnerships and businesses to be subject under the payroll expense tax and expand the tax exemption to businesses that have annual payroll expenses of $250,000 or less.

Proposition R 

Proposition R would rename the Oceanside Water Pollution Control Plant to the George W. Bush Sewage Plant.

Proposition S 

Proposition S would make it City policy that voters will not approve new set-asides of City revenue that do not identify a new funding source, limit annual increases, and expire in ten years.

Proposition T 

Proposition T would mandate the City to maintain funding for and provide enough free and low-cost substance abuse treatment services to meet demand.

Proposition U 

Proposition U would make it City policy that representatives and senators in the United States Congress vote against further funding for deploying troops to Iraq, except for funds to withdraw such troops.

Proposition V 

Proposition V would make it City policy to urge the San Francisco Board of Education to reverse its elimination of the Junior Reserve Officers' Training Corps (JROTC).

External links
 San Francisco Department of Elections

San Francisco 11
2008 11
Elections 11
San Francisco 11
2000s in San Francisco